Ophichthus brevicaudatus is an eel in the family Ophichthidae (worm/snake eels). It was described by Chu Yuan-Ting, Wu Han-Lin and Jin Xin-Bo in 1981. It is a marine, subtropical eel which is known from its type locality in the Taiwan Strait, in the northwestern Pacific Ocean.

References

brevicaudatus
Taxa named by Chu Yuan-Ting 
Taxa named by Wu Han-Lin
Taxa named by Jin Xin-Bo
Fish described in 1981